The Legendary is an EP released by The Roots on July 20, 1999.

Track listing
Continuation from Things Fall Apart

Recorded live at Palais X-Tra, Zurich, Switzerland, May 6, 1999.

External links
 The Legendary at Discogs

1999 EPs
The Roots albums
MCA Records EPs